The Lincoln Lions Rugby Football Club is a rugby union club based in Lincoln, England. The club was formed in 1902.

Honours
East Midlands First Division: 1913, 1919, 1939, 1947, 1948, 1992, 1998, 2003, 2004
East Midlands Second Division: 1905, 1906, 1925, 1977, 1979, 1989
East Midlands Third Division: 1974
National Cup winners: 1931, 1934, 1982, 1993
National Cup finalists: 1929, 1951, 1973, 1977, 1999
East Midlands Cup winners: 2004*, 2005*, 2006*, 2007*, 2008*
East Midlands Cup finalists: 1909
*The National Cup format was revised in 2001 by the RFU into inter-county competitions.

See also
East Midlands
Rugby union in England

English rugby union teams
Sport in Lincoln, England